Michael Joseph M. Barrett (1943 – 17 July 2021), also known as Jo Jo Barrett, was an Irish Gaelic footballer and manager. He played for the Austin Stacks club and at senior level for the Kerry county team, before later serving as a club manager and, briefly, as manager of the Wexford county team.

Playing career
Born in Tralee, County Kerry, Barrett first came to Gaelic football prominence as a schoolboy with Tralee CBS. He first appeared on the inter-county scene during a two-year tenure with the Kerry minor team before winning an All-Ireland Under-21 Championship title in 1964. Barrett was just out of the minor grade when he made his senior debut during the 1961 Grounds' Tournament semi-final against Offaly. He was just 19-years-old when he came on as a substitute in Kerry's 1962 All-Ireland final defeat of Roscommon. Barrett subsequently won a National League title and was part of four Munster Championship-winning teams. He experienced club success in the twilight of his career, winning County Championship titles with Austin Stacks.

Management career
After retiring from club football, Barrett immediately took over the management of the Austin Stacks club and guided the team to the 1977 All-Ireland Club Championship title. He later steered Clara to a first Offaly County Championship title in 27 years. Barrett's tenure as manager of the Wexford senior football team ended in controversial circumstances when he received a two-year suspension by the GAA's Games Administration Committee for striking referee Mick Curley at the conclusion of their National League match against Cavan.

Personal life and death
Barrett was the son of six-time All-Ireland-winner Joe Barrett. After a spell in the United States working as a barman, labourer and house painter, he returned in 1989 to work as a journalist in Dublin. Barrett died at his home in Barrow, Ardfert, County Kerry on 17 July 2021.

As of 1999, Barrett was working as a Gaelic Games reporter for the Evening Herald newspaper.

Career statistics

Honours

Player
Austin Stacks
Kerry Senior Football Championship: 1973, 1975

Kerry
All-Ireland Senior Football Championship: 1962
Munster Senior Football Championship: 1962, 1963, 1964, 1965
National Football League: 1962-63
All-Ireland Under-21 Football Championship: 1964
Munster Under-21 Football Championship: 1964

Manager
Austin Stacks
All-Ireland Senior Club Football Championship: 1977
Munster Senior Club Football Championship: 1976
Kerry Senior Football Championship: 1976

Clara
Offaly Senior Football Championship: 1991

References

1943 births
2021 deaths
Austin Stacks Gaelic footballers
Bartenders
Gaelic football managers
Gaelic games writers and broadcasters
Irish expatriates in the United States
Irish sports journalists
Kerry inter-county Gaelic footballers
The Herald (Ireland) people